The canton of Neuvéglise-sur-Truyère (before November 2019: canton of Neuvéglise) is an administrative division of the Cantal department, southern France. It was created at the French canton reorganisation which came into effect in March 2015. Its seat is in Neuvéglise-sur-Truyère.

It consists of the following communes:
 
Alleuze
Anglards-de-Saint-Flour
Anterrieux
Celoux
Chaliers
Chaudes-Aigues
Chazelles
Clavières
Deux-Verges
Espinasse
Fridefont
Jabrun
Lieutadès
Lorcières
Maurines
Neuvéglise-sur-Truyère
Rageade
Ruynes-en-Margeride
Saint-Georges
Saint-Martial
Saint-Rémy-de-Chaudes-Aigues
Saint-Urcize
Soulages
La Trinitat
Vabres
Val-d'Arcomie
Védrines-Saint-Loup

References

Cantons of Cantal